Aighton, Bailey and Chaigley is a civil parish in Ribble Valley, Lancashire, England.  It contains 55 listed buildings that are recorded in the National Heritage List for England.  Of these, three are listed at Grade I, the highest of the three grades, five are at Grade II*, the middle grade, and the others are at Grade II, the lowest grade.  The most important building in the parish is Stonyhurst College; many of the buildings comprising the college and associated with it are listed.  The parish contains the village of Hurst Green, which also contains listed buildings, including houses, public houses, and almshouses.  Outside these areas the listed buildings include other houses and associated structures, farmhouses and farm buildings, crosses, the ruins of a chapel, bridges, a mausoleum, a church, and a vicarage.

Key

Buildings

Notes and references

Notes

Citations

Sources

Lists of listed buildings in Lancashire
Buildings and structures in Ribble Valley